The Hong Kong women's national cricket team is the team that represents the Chinese special administrative region of Hong Kong in international women's cricket. In April 2018, the International Cricket Council (ICC) granted full Women's Twenty20 International (WT20I) status to all its members. Therefore, all Twenty20 matches played between Hong Kong women and other ICC members after 1 July 2018 will be a full WT20I. Hong Kong made its Twenty20 International debut against Indonesia on 12 January 2019 at Bangkok during the Thailand Women's T20 Smash.

History
They made their international debut in September 2006, playing against Pakistan in a three match series of one-day games to decide which country would represent the Asia region in the Women's Cricket World Cup Qualifier in Ireland in 2007. They lost the series 3-0 after a series of heavy defeats, two by more than 200 runs.

In 2009, the Hong Kong women's team won the ACC Women's T20 Championship Trophy, then defended their title and won the tournament again in 2011, narrowly defeating Chinawith three balls to spare.

In 2010 Asian Games, Hong Kong team lost to Nepal as they finished 7th in the tournament at Guanggong Cricket Stadium in Guangzhou.

In 2014 Asian Games, Hong Kong team reached quarter-finals where they lost to Sri Lanka at Yeonhui Cricket Ground in Incheon.

In 2017, the Hong Kong women's team won the 2017 Women's Twenty20 East Asia Cup, with Yasmin Daswani awarded Player of the Tournament 

In December 2020, the ICC announced the qualification pathway for the 2023 ICC Women's T20 World Cup. Hong Kong were named in the 2021 ICC Women's T20 World Cup Asia Qualifier regional group, alongside seven other teams.

Tournament history

ICC Women's T20 World Cup Asia Qualifier

Women's Asia Cup (T20I format)

Asian Games (T20I format)

Women Twenty20 East Asia Cup

Records and Statistics 

International Match Summary — Hong Kong Women
 
Last updated 30 October 2022

Twenty20 International 

 Highest team total: 155/3 v. Kuwait on 28 November 2021 at ICC Academy Ground, Dubai.
 Highest individual score: 86*, Natasha Miles v. Japan on 29 October 2022 at Kaizuka Cricket Ground, Kaizuka.
 Best individual bowling figures: 5/7, Kary Chan v. China on 19 September 2019 at Yeonhui Cricket Ground, Incheon.

Most T20I runs for Hong Kong Women

Most T20I wickets for Hong Kong Women

T20I record versus other nations

Records complete to WT20I #1285. Last updated 30 October 2022.

Squad

This lists all the players who were named in the most recent squad. Updated as on 30 October 2022

See also

 List of Hong Kong women Twenty20 International cricketers
 Hong Kong national cricket team

References

External links
 Hong Kong Cricket Association
 Cricket.com
 Hong Kong tour of Pakistan scorecards 

Cricket in Hong Kong
Cricket, women's
Women's national cricket teams
Women
Women's sport in Hong Kong